Kumkumacheppu is a 1996 Indian Malayalam film, directed by Thulasidas and produced by R. Mukesh Mehta. The film stars Shobhana, Manoj K. Jayan, KPAC Lalitha and Jagadish in the lead roles. The film has musical score by S. P. Venkatesh. This film is the Malayalam remake of Telugu film Maavichiguru, which released about 2 months earlier in that year.

Cast
Manoj K. Jayan as Madhu
Shobhana as Indu
Priya Raman as Deepa
Nedumudi Venu as Sekharan
Reena as Nalini
Narendraprasad as Grandfather
KPAC Lalitha as Grandmother
Jagadish as Mani
Vishnu Vijay Vijayakumar as Chindu

Soundtrack
The music was composed by S. P. Venkatesh and the lyrics were written by Kaithapram.

References

External links
 

1996 films
1990s Malayalam-language films
Malayalam remakes of Telugu films
Films directed by Thulasidas
Films scored by S. P. Venkatesh